Joan of Arc: Siege & the Sword is a 1989 video game published by Broderbund.

Gameplay
Joan of Arc: Siege & the Sword is a game in which the player is Charles IV of France in 1428 and must use Joan's "miracle" army against rebellious French dukes and the invading English.

Reception
Chris Lombardi reviewed the game for Computer Gaming World, and stated that "It has a wonderful setting, a nice 'look and feel', and elements that truly capture the spirit of the historical period, but the prevalence and nature of the action sequences, along with the quirks in Al and design, keep it from being "all that it could be" and prevent one from offering a wholehearted recommendation."

Reviews
The Games Machine - Jan, 1989
Atari ST User - Mar, 1989
Info - Jul, 1990
Commodore User - Dec, 1988
The One - Dec, 1988
Amiga User International - Jan, 1989
Amiga World - May, 1990

References

External links
Review in Compute!
Review in Page 6

1989 video games
Action video games
Amiga games
Atari ST games
DOS games
Hundred Years' War in fiction
Strategy video games
Video games developed in the United States
Video games featuring female protagonists
Video games set in the 15th century
Video games set in the Middle Ages
Video games set in France
Works about Joan of Arc